Achille Etna Michallon (1796–1822) was a French painter.

Michallon was the son of the sculptor Claude Michallon and nephew of the sculptor Guillaume Francin. He studied under Jacques-Louis David and Pierre-Henri de Valenciennes. In 1817, Michallon won the inaugural Prix de Rome for landscape painting. He travelled to Italy in 1818 and remained there for over two years. This trip had a profound influence on his work. Before he had much time to develop what he had learned however, he died at the age of 25 of pneumonia, a tragedy which cut short the life of a talented and well respected artist who could have gone on to win lasting fame. Though it is often disputed, it is thought that at one time, Corot was his pupil.

Selective list of works
 The Oak and the Reed (1816), Fitzwilliam Museum, based on the version of Aesop's fable by Jean de la Fontaine
 Study of a Tree, (circa 1816), National Gallery, - National Gallery, London
 Démocrite et les Abdéritains (1817), École des beaux-arts of Paris (Prix de Rome)
 Paysage de Frascati (1817),  musée du Louvre
 La Mort de Roland à Roncevaux (1819), musée du Louvre
 Homme drapé en rouge : habitant de Frascatti (?), musée du Louvre
 La Femme foudroyée, musée du Louvre
 The Forum at Pompeii, 1819, National Gallery of Art, Washington DC

Bibliography 
 Raymond Escholier La peinture française du XIXe siècle, de David à Géricaut, Librairie Floury, 1941.
 Pierre Caillau-Lamicq, « Achille-Etna Michallon », in Pierre Miquel, Le paysage français au XIX° siècle, Mantes-la-Jolie, 1975, T. II, p. 75-85.
 Achille-Etna Michallon, Catalogue de l'exposition, Paris, musée du Louvre, 1994.
 Blandine Lesage, « Achille-Etna Michallon (1796-1822). Catalogue de l'œuvre peint », in Gazette des Beaux-Arts, October 1997, T. CXXX.

References

Prix de Rome for painting
19th-century French painters
French male painters
1796 births
1822 deaths
Pupils of Jacques-Louis David
Deaths from pneumonia in France
Artists from Paris
19th-century French male artists
18th-century French male artists